The 2009 NCAA Bowling Championship was the sixth annual tournament to determine the national champion of women's NCAA collegiate ten-pin bowling. The tournament was played at Super Bowl Lanes in Canton, Michigan during April 2009.

Nebraska defeated Central Missouri in the championship match, 4 games to 1, to win their third national title.

Qualification
Since there is only one national collegiate championship for women's bowling, all NCAA bowling programs (whether from Division I, Division II, or Division III) were eligible. A total of 8 teams were invited to contest this championship, which consisted of a modified double-elimination style tournament.

Tournament bracket 
Site: Super Bowl Lanes, Canton, Michigan

All-tournament team
Cassandra Leuthold, Nebraska
Valerie Calberry, Nebraska
Theresa Christopher, Central Missouri
Sara Litteral, Fairleigh Dickinson
Erica Perez, Fairleigh Dickinson

References

NCAA Bowling Championship
NCAA Bowling Championship
2009 in bowling
2009 in sports in Michigan
April 2009 sports events in the United States